Trade Catcher is an online and hard-copy source of tradesmen information and is updated on a monthly basis.
Trade Catcher was founded by Andrew Hutchison and Denise Hutchison in November 2003 and its name is registered with the UK Intellectual Property Office. Initially based in Eastbourne the premises are now located in Hailsham.

Every month home owners in Eastbourne, Hailsham and Seaford are receiving information illustrating tradesmen types, the specific services they offer, their contact details and any certified membership organisations they may be members of if relevant. The information is also presented to a wider audience via the web.

Since its launch in 2003, Trade Catcher functions on a monthly schedule charging its featured Tradesmen 'Monthly Listing Fees'. The fees range from £22.20 to £122.40.
All Trade Catcher listings include: Plumbers, Dentists, Builders, Roofers, Beauticians, Estate Agents and other tradesmen.

History

After losing his job as a draughtsman in the Autumn of 2003 co-founder Andrew Hutchison together with his wife Denise Hutchison, decided upon providing a service that puts home owners in touch with tradesmen and women with up to date information.

References

External links 
 tradecatcher.com

British websites